Chris Rodriguez better known by C-Rod, is an American songwriter, record producer, music arranger, mixer, engineer, and remixer.  He wrote and produced Paulina Rubio's  Billboard charting singles, Lo Haré Por Ti, El Último Adiós, and Algo Tienes as well as producing singles for Celia Cruz, Thalía, Ana Cristina, Chayanne, Danna Paola, and Erika Jayne, among others.

He wrote Michael Murphy's #1 charting single So Damn Beautiful, as well as others.

As a recording artist C-Rod's single, Beat Don't Stop, charted at #3 and Stay at #8 on Billboard's Dance charts, among others.

Rodriguez has remixed charting singles for Lady Gaga, Ricky Martin, Jennifer Lopez, Pet Shop Boys, and others. His Spanish remix of Enrique Iglesias's Duele el Corazón charted at #1.

Early life
Chris Rodriguez was born in Miami, Florida.  He began playing piano as a teenager.  At 18 years old he began recording songs on his four-track recorder in a small room in his father's warehouse.  He graduated from the University of Miami with a bachelor's degree in musical theater.

Career
C-Rod rose to prominence in the early 2000s producing Latin singer, Paulina Rubio's, #1 Billboard single, Algo Tienes, and #7 single, Lo Haré Por Ti, and numerous others.

As a recording artist C-Rod's singles, Beat Don't Stop (featuring Jason Walker) charted at #3, Stay (featuring Brendan O'Hara) at #8,  and Raise Your Hands (featuring Jason Walker) at #17 on Billboard's Dance charts, among others.

Rodriguez has remixed charting singles for Lady Gaga, Ricky Martin, Jennifer Lopez, Pet Shop Boys, and others. His Spanish remix of Enrique Iglesias's Duele el Corazón charted at #1.

He has produced singles for Celia Cruz, Thalía (La Super Chica), Ana Cristina (¡Vivan los niños! & A Un Paso De Mi Amor), Chayanne (Boom Boom), Danna Paola (Ruleta), Ednita Nazario (Te Quedarás Hundido), and Erika Jayne (Painkillr), among others.

Rodriguez launched his independent record label, developing new artists and doing remixes for artists Lady Gaga, Jennifer Lopez, and Ricky Martin.  He is a signed writer and producer with Sony/ATV Publishing. In 2018, One Horizon Group, Inc. acquired C-Rod, Inc., along with its record label, Velveteen Entertainment and media content division. Rodriguez is now the owner of Mues Media Studio in Miami.

Rodriguez wrote the ¡Vivan los niños!, the closing song for TV show, ¡Vivan los niños! recorded by Ana Cristina.  His song, Perfect Picture appeared in the film, Easy A, starring Emma Stone.

Billboard Singles Chart

Singles

References

Living people
Record producers from Florida
Musicians from Miami
American songwriters
American record producers
Latin music record producers
Year of birth missing (living people)